The 1929 Milan–San Remo was the 22nd edition of the Milan–San Remo cycle race and was held on 19 March 1929. The race started in Milan and finished in San Remo. The race was won by Alfredo Binda.

General classification

References

1929
1929 in road cycling
1929 in Italian sport
March 1929 sports events